Halil İbrahim Fırtına (born 1941 in Ordu, Turkey) is a retired Turkish Air Force General and Commander of the Turkish Air Force.

Fırtına retired in 2005. He was tried in the alleged "Sledgehammer" coup plan conspiracy by senior members of the Turkish armed forces.

Fırtına was awarded with Legion d'honneur in 2006, but he declined the award.

References

1941 births
Living people
People from Ordu
Turkish Air Force Academy alumni
Turkish Air Force generals
Commanders of the Turkish Air Force
Légion d'honneur refusals